Ciro Henrique Alves Ferreira e Silva (born 18 April 1989 in Salgueiro), commonly known as Ciro Alves or simply Ciro, is a Brazilian professional footballer who plays as a winger for Liga 1 club Persib Bandung.

Club career

Sport Recife 
Ciro started his career in Sport Recife with a lot of promise. In 2008, Ciro played a few matches for the main team, scoring four goals (one against Ipatinga, one against Vasco and two against Atlético Mineiro) in eight games, three as a starter.
In 2009, he started the year as a starter, scoring seven goals in ten matches in the Campeonato Pernambucano. He also played in the 2009 Copa Libertadores, the most prestigious club tournament in South America, in which he a goal and an assist in a match against Colo-Colo at the latter's base in Santiago, Chile. Legendary Pele, commented after seeing the young Brazilian play, stating that Ciro would be one of the best players in the world within the next five years.

Difficult years 
Pele's prophecy did not come true. On 20 May 2011, Ciro left Recife and signed a two-year loan deal with Brazilian Série A side Fluminense in an attempt to pursue national recognition in Brazil. After playing more than a dozen games, he could not secure a solid spot on the roster in the famed club. He faced the same fate in the subsequent Brazilian clubs that he joined, leading to a decision to find opportunities in Asia. On 22 July 2015, he joined Korean club Jeju United but the experiment also failed after a few months. Afterward, he went through several Brazilian teams without making a lasting mark.

Chonburi F.C. 
At the age of 28 in 2018, when his promising talent was unfulfilled, Ciro gave Asia a second try with a move to top-flight Thailand club Chonburi, which resurrected his career. He played in 31 matches, a lot more playing time than in any other of his post-Recife clubs, and scored five goals.

Indonesia 
His success in Thailand attracted offers from Indonesia, including the army-owned Persikabo 1973 where he played for three years - the longest spell after his promising start with Recife. He scored 35 goals in 67 matches for Persikabo, proving that he was a prolific striker who can carry his team. His performance led Persib Bandung, the club with the largest fanbase in Liga 1, to secure his service for the 2022-23 season of Liga 1 and the club's participation in the 2023 AFC Cup.

International career 
Ciro was a member of the Brazil national under-20 football team in 2009 when he played in the 2009 FIFA U-20 World Cup, in which Brazil came second.

Honours

Club
Sport Recife
Campeonato Pernambucano: 2009, 2010
Bahia
Campeonato Baiano: 2012

International
Brazil U20
 FIFA U-20 World Cup runner-up: 2009

Individual
 Campeonato Pernambucano Top Scorer: 2010
 Liga 1 Goal of the Month: January 2022
 Liga 1 Team of the Season: 2021–22
 APPI Indonesian Football Award Best Midfielder: 2021–22
 APPI Indonesian Football Award Best 11: 2021–22

References

External links
 futpedia.globo.com
 ogol.com.br

1989 births
Sportspeople from Pernambuco
Brazilian footballers
Brazil youth international footballers
Brazil under-20 international footballers
Sport Club do Recife players
Fluminense FC players
Esporte Clube Bahia players
Club Athletico Paranaense players
Figueirense FC players
Luverdense Esporte Clube players
Jeju United FC players
Clube do Remo players
Joinville Esporte Clube players
Ciro Alves
Persikabo 1973 players
Persib Bandung players
K League 1 players
Campeonato Brasileiro Série A players
Campeonato Brasileiro Série B players
Campeonato Brasileiro Série C players
Ciro Alves
Liga 1 (Indonesia) players
Brazilian expatriate footballers
Brazilian expatriate sportspeople in South Korea
Expatriate footballers in South Korea
Brazilian expatriate sportspeople in Thailand
Expatriate footballers in Thailand
Brazilian expatriate sportspeople in Indonesia
Expatriate footballers in Indonesia
Living people
Association football wingers